Yuanping is a city in Shanxi, China.

Yuanping or Yuan Ping may also refer to:

Yuanping era (74 BC), era name of the Emperor Zhao of Han
Yuan Ping (swimmer), holder of a Taiwanese record in swimming